Worldwide Love is a 1991 compilation album by the Australian group Little River Band. It compiles songs from the band's previous two albums, Monsoon and Get Lucky, with the exception of the title track, "Worldwide Love", written by band members Tony Sciuto, Derek Pellicci and Peter Beckett which had not been previously released. The album was not released in Australia.

Track listing 
"Worldwide Love"
"It's Cold Out Tonight"
"There's Not Another You"
"Soul Searching"
"Parallel Lines"
"Son of a Famous Man"
"The Rhythm King"
"If I Get Lucky"
"I Dream Alone"
"The One That Got Away"

Charts

References

Little River Band albums
1991 compilation albums
Curb Records compilation albums